is a South Korean professional footballer who plays as a centre back for J2 League club Zweigen Kanazawa on loan from Sagan Tosu.

Career
Son begin first youth career with Shochi Fukaya High School, when he entered to Rissho University in 2018. He was graduation from university in 2021.

On 6 May 2021, Son begin first professional career with Sagan Tosu from 2022 season.

On 14 June 2022, Son was loaned out to J2 club, Zweigen Kanazawa for during 2022 season.

Personal life
His paternal great grandfather is Korean, and his grandson himself was born and raised in Japan, but his nationality is Korean.

Career statistics

Club
.

References

External links

1999 births
Living people
Association football people from Tokyo
Rissho University alumni
South Korean footballers
Japanese footballers
Japanese people of South Korean descent
Association football defenders
Sagan Tosu players
Zweigen Kanazawa players
J1 League players
J2 League players